Colloquy may refer to:

 Colloquy (religious), a meeting to settle differences of doctrine or dogma
 Colloquy (company), a loyalty marketing company based in Milford, Ohio
 Colloquy (law), a legal term
 Colloquy (IRC client), an IRC client for Mac OS X and iOS

See also
 Northwestern University Law Review Colloquy, the online companion of the Northwestern University Law Review